Stoney Creek Township is one of eleven townships in Randolph County, Indiana. As of the 2010 census, its population was 990 and it contained 425 housing units.

Stoney Creek Township was established in 1826.

Geography

Unincorporated towns
 Georgetown at 
 Pinch at 
 Windsor at 
(This list is based on USGS data and may include former settlements.)

References

External links
 Indiana Township Association
 United Township Association of Indiana

Townships in Randolph County, Indiana
Townships in Indiana